Mikal is a given name. Notable people with the name include:

Mikal Bridges (born 1996), American basketball player
Mikal Cronin (born 1985), American musician and songwriter
Mikal Gilmore (born 1951), American writer and music journalist
Mikal Moore, member of the band Mutha's Day Out
Thomas Mikal Ford (1964–2016), sometimes credited as Tommy Ford, American actor and comedian

See also
Mikel, given name